Petar Relić (1939–2005), nicknamed Saka, was a politician in Serbia. He was a member of the Assembly of Vojvodina from 1993 to 2004 and served as secretary of the Sombor municipal assembly. For most of his time as an elected official, Relić was a member of the Democratic Party (Demokratska stranka, DS). Late in his life, he was implicated in a significant financial scandal in Sombor.

Private career
Relić held a Bachelor of Laws degree.

Politician
Relić ran for Sombor's first constituency seat in the 1990 Serbian parliamentary election as an independent candidate and was defeated by Josip Subotić of the Socialist Party of Serbia (Socijalistička partija Srbije, SPS). He was later elected to the Vojvodina assembly in the December 1992 provincial election for Sombor's sixth division with a combined endorsement from the DS, the Reform Democratic Party of Vojvodina, and the Democratic Movement of Serbia (Demokratski pokret Srbije, DEPOS). He took his seat when the assembly convened in early 1993. The SPS won a majority victory in the election, and Relić served in opposition.

If he was not already a member of the DS when he was elected to the provincial assembly, he soon joined the party and appeared in the ninth position on its electoral list for the Novi Sad division in the 1993 Serbian parliamentary election. The list won four seats, and he did not receive a mandate. (From 1992 to 2000, Serbia's electoral law stipulated that one-third of parliamentary mandates would be assigned to candidates on successful lists in numerical order, while the remaining two-thirds would be distributed amongst other candidates at the discretion of sponsoring parties or coalitions. Relić could have been given a mandate despite his relatively low position on the list, but he was not.)

The DS participated in the 1996 provincial election as part of the Zajedno coalition, and Relić was re-elected under its banner in Sombor's sixth division. The SPS again won the election, and Relić continued to serve in opposition. 

For the 2000 provincial election, the DS was a leading force in a multi-party coalition called the Democratic Opposition of Serbia (Demokratska opozicija Srbije, DOS). The DOS won a landslide majority victory; Relić was again re-elected and this time served as a supporter of the administration. He also served as secretary of the Sombor municipal assembly in this time.

He later left the DS and ran in the 2004 provincial election as the leader of a local coalition of four smaller parties. He was defeated.

Financial scandal
Shortly before the end of his life, Relić was implicated in a scandal involving the disappearance of more than five million dinars from the Sombor municipal budget between 1999 and 2001. He died in 2005 before the case went to trial. A district court verdict in December 2007 found that Relić and two other municipal officials had exceeded their authority to dispose of money from three municipal budget accounts and falsified the signatures of the president and vice-president of the executive board. The core of the scandal involved a series of dubious currency transactions; Relić said in his police interrogation that "the purchase of foreign currency for special purposes" had been done more-or-less openly in the Sombor municipal government. These events occurred at a time of political upheaval in Serbia; at the end of the trial, it was still not known for what purpose the money had been used.

Electoral record

Provincial (Vojvodina)

National Assembly of Serbia

References

1939 births
2005 deaths
Politicians from Sombor
Members of the Assembly of Vojvodina
Democratic Party (Serbia) politicians